The polar climate regions are characterized by a lack of warm summers but with varying winters. Regions with a polar climate cover more than 20% of the Earth's area. Most of these regions are far from the equator and near the poles, and in this case, winter days are extremely short and summer days are extremely long (could last for the entirety of each season or longer). A polar climate consists of cool summers and very cold winters, which results in treeless tundra, glaciers, or a permanent or semi-permanent layer of ice. It is identified with the letter E in the Köppen climate classification.

Subtypes

There are two types of polar climate: ET, or tundra climate; and EF, or ice cap climate. A tundra climate is characterized by having at least one month whose average temperature is above , while an ice cap climate has no months averaging above . In a tundra climate, even coniferous trees cannot grow, but other specialized plants can grow. In an ice cap climate, no plants can grow, and ice gradually accumulates until it flows or slides elsewhere. Alpine climate can mimic either tundra or ice cap climate.

Locations 

On Earth, the only continent where the ice cap polar climate is predominant is Antarctica. All but a few isolated coastal areas on the island of Greenland also have the ice cap climate. Summits of many high mountains also have ice cap climate due to their high elevation. Coastal regions of Greenland that do not have permanent ice sheets have the less extreme tundra climates. The northernmost part of the Eurasian land mass, from the extreme northeastern coast of Scandinavia and eastwards to the Bering Strait, large areas of northern Siberia and northern Iceland have tundra climate as well. Large areas in northern Canada and northern Alaska have tundra climate, changing to ice cap climate in the most northern parts of Canada. These subantarctic lowlands are found closer to the equator than the coastal tundras of the Arctic basin. Summits of many mountains of Earth also have polar climates, due to their higher elevations.

Arctic

Some parts of the Arctic are covered by ice (sea ice, glacial ice, or snow) year-round, especially at the most poleward parts; and nearly all parts of the Arctic experience long periods with some form of ice or snow on the surface.

The Arctic consists of ocean that is almost surrounded by landmasses like Russia and Canada. As such, the climate of much of the Arctic is moderated by the ocean water, which can never have a temperature below . In winter, this relatively warm water, even though covered by the polar ice pack, keeps the North Pole from being the coldest place in the Northern Hemisphere, and it is also part of the reason that Antarctica is so much colder than the Arctic. In summer, the presence of the nearby water keeps coastal areas from warming as much as they might otherwise, just as it does in temperate regions with maritime climates.

Antarctica

The climate of Antarctica is the coldest on Earth. Antarctica has the lowest naturally occurring temperature ever recorded:  at Vostok Station. It is also extremely dry (technically a desert, or so called polar desert), averaging  of precipitation per year, as weather fronts rarely penetrate far into the continent.

Mountains 
Summits of most mountains also have polar climates, despite being in lower latitudes, due to their high elevations. All mountains of the Rocky Mountains, Alps, and the Caucasus have tundra climate. Some mountains of the Andes, the Saint Elias Mountains, and most mountains of the Himalayas, the Karakoram, the Hindu Kush Range, Pamir Mountains, the Tian Shan Mountains, and the Alaska Range, have ice cap climate. Only the summit of Mount Rainier has an ice cap climate in the Cascade Range.

Quantifying polar climate
There have been several attempts at quantifying what constitutes a polar climate.

Climatologist Wladimir Köppen demonstrated a relationship between the Arctic and Antarctic tree lines and the  summer isotherm; i.e., places where the average temperature in the warmest calendar month of the year is below the fixed threshold of  cannot support forests. See Köppen climate classification for more information.

Nordenskiöld's line tends to run to the north of Köppen's near the west coasts of the Northern Hemisphere continents, south of it in the interior sections, and at about the same latitude along the east coasts of both Asia and North America. In the Southern Hemisphere, all of Tierra del Fuego lies outside the polar region in Nordenskiöld's system, but part of the island (including Ushuaia, Argentina) is reckoned as being within the Antarctic under Köppen's.

In 1947, Holdridge improved on these schemes, by defining biotemperature: the mean annual temperature, where all temperatures below  (and above ) are treated as 0 °C (because it makes no difference to plant life, being dormant).

See also
 Tundra climate
 Ice cap climate
 Köppen climate classification
 Arctic oscillation
 Climate change in the Arctic
 Global warming in Antarctica

References

External links

 NOAA State of the Arctic Report 2006

Köppen climate types
Polar regions of the Earth